The 2003 WNBA season was the seventh season for the Los Angeles Sparks franchise. The Sparks reached the WNBA Finals for the third consecutive season, but fell to the Detroit Shock in three games.

Offseason

Dispersal Draft

WNBA Draft

Regular season

Season standings

Season schedule

Player stats

References

Los Angeles Sparks seasons
Los Angeles
Western Conference (WNBA) championship seasons
Los Angeles Sparks